Majimegawa Dam is an earthfill dam located in Yamaguchi prefecture in Japan. The dam is used for flood control. The catchment area of the dam is 2.4 km2. The dam impounds about 12  ha of land when full and can store 842 thousand cubic meters of water. The construction of the dam was started on 1992 and completed in 2008.

References

Dams in Yamaguchi Prefecture
2008 establishments in Japan